Tyler Baze (born October 19, 1982, in Seattle, Washington) is an American Champion jockey. He was born into a racing family, since both of his parents were jockeys, as is his uncle, Gary Baze. His second cousin is U.S. Racing Hall of Fame jockey Russell Baze.

Baze began riding in Southern California in 1999 and earned his first victory on October 31 of that year. In 2000, he rode 246 winners and was voted the Eclipse Award for Outstanding Apprentice Jockey.

Baze went through a rough patch beginning in 2003, but recovered with a new agent and a new nutritional regime.  He rides mostly at California's Santa Anita Park and Phoenix, Arizona's Turf Paradise.

In August 2011 he was sidelined due to substance abuse but returned to racing in October 2012.  His first win back occurred on October 13, 2012, in the Lava Man California Classic Cup aboard Lucky Primo.

Year-end charts

References

External links
 Tyler Baze at the NTRA
 A 2004 profile of Tyler Baze at About, Inc., a part of The New York Times Company

1982 births
Baze family
American jockeys
Eclipse Award winners
Sportspeople from Seattle
Living people